Chetpet is a locality in the Indian city of Chennai It is served by Chetpet railway station in the Beach–Tambaram line of Chennai Suburban Railway. Chetpet has a pond between the Chetpet railway station and the Poonamallee High Road, one of the last surviving natural water bodies in the city. It is the locality in Chennai where the mathematician Ramanujan died.

History
Along with Egmore and Nungambakkam, Chetpet is considered one of the original villages merged by the British to form Chennai.

Development
Until recently, the waters of Chetpet lake supplied groundwater recharge for the surrounding neighbourhoods.

Location – Chetpet
Chetpet is located at the center of Chennai, not far from Egmore railway station. CMBT is 8 km from Chetpet.

Educational institutions
Auxilium Girls Higher Secondary School
Lady Andal Venkata Subba Rao Matriculation School
Madras Christian College Higher Secondary School
Madras Christian College Matriculation Higher Secondary School
Maharishi Vidya Mandir Senior Secondary School
Sherwood Hall Senior Secondary School	
The Madras Seva Sadan Higher Secondary School
Union Christian Matriculation Higher Secondary School

Gallery

Location in context

References

Neighbourhoods in Chennai
Cities and towns in Chennai district